Teratocarcinoma-derived growth factor 1 is a protein that in humans is encoded by the TDGF1 gene. The protein is an extracellular, membrane-bound signaling protein that plays an essential role in embryonic development and tumor growth. Mutations in this gene are associated with forebrain defects. Pseudogenes of this gene are found on chromosomes 2, 3, 6, 8, 19 and X. Alternate splicing results in multiple transcript variants.

References

Further reading

See also 
Cripto